Mohammadabad (also Romanized as Moḩammadābād; also known as Mahdābād and Mehdīābād) is a village in Dar Agah Rural District, in the Central District of Hajjiabad County, Hormozgan Province, Iran. At the 2006 census, its population was 107, in 33 families.

References 

Populated places in Hajjiabad County